N'Dolo Airport , also known as Ndolo Airport, is a secondary airport in the city of Kinshasa, Democratic Republic of the Congo, located in the commune of Barumbu near the city center.

The Aviation militaire de la Force Publique was established here in October 1940 with requisitioned aircraft.

The airline Air Kasaï had its head office on the airport property.

Runways are limited to aircraft under  since the disastrous crash of January 8, 1996, in which an Antonov An-32 aborted takeoff and overran the runway into a market.

Runway length includes a  displaced threshold on Runway 08.

Airlines and destinations

See also

Transport in the Democratic Republic of the Congo
List of airports in the Democratic Republic of the Congo

References

External links

OpenStreetMap - Ndolo Airport

Airports in Kinshasa
Buildings and structures in Kinshasa
Lukunga District